La tempesta di mare ("The Storm at Sea"), a flute concerto in F major (RV 433; P. 261), is the first of Six Flute Concertos, Op. 10 by Antonio Vivaldi, published in the late 1720s. La tempesta di mare may also refer to two earlier versions of the same concerto, RV 98, a concerto da camera (chamber concerto) featuring the flute, from which Vivaldi derived the concerto grosso RV 570.

La tempesta di mare may also refer to the violin concerto with the same name published in the same 1725 edition as the Four Seasons: this is however a different composition than the three flute concerto variants.

History 
Vivaldi helped to bring the concerto to a mainstream form, not only by expanding on ritornello form, but by emphasizing the slow movements of concertos, which were in a two part binary form. Solo instruments that Vivaldi wrote concertos for include violin, bassoon, cello, oboe, viola d'amore, flute and mandolin. He also wrote ensemble concertos (concerto grosso and/or chamber concerto), where three or more soloists participate, which number over 30 written. Vivaldi had an extensive influence on the concerto genre, helping to pioneer the structure, expanding the boundaries of the genre, and showing that any instrument could have a concerto.

Vivaldi's contemporaries and predecessors such as Purcell, Bach and Handel featured the flute (traverso and/or recorder) significantly in their works. RV 433 was conceived as a concerto for transverse flute in D. The first publication of the concerto, included as No. 1 in Vivaldi's Op. 10, VI Concerti a Flauto Traverso, was around 1728 in Amsterdam, by Michel-Charles Le Cène. The La tempesta di mare name for the concerto is given in the score.

Giving a musical impression of a storm was a popular theme in baroque music. For instance operas like Marin Marais' Alcyone contained famous storm scenes. Telemann wrote a secular cantata La Tempesta (The Storm), TWV 20:42, after an Italian libretto by Metastasio. Vivaldi wrote several tempesta di mare concertos. Two variants of RV 433, RV 98 and RV 570, are in the chamber concerto and concerto grosso format respectively. RV 98 is scored for flute, oboe, violin, bassoon, and continuo, from which Vivaldi created the RV 570 concerto grosso by adding orchestral violins to reinforce the solo oboe and violin, and a viola part doubling the bass at the upper octave. An unrelated tempesta di mare concerto, a violin concerto in E major, RV 253, is included as No. 5 in Vivaldi's Op. 8 Il cimento dell'armonia e dell'inventione. The Four Seasons, the first four concertos of that collection, also include a few musical depictions of stormy weather.

According to Federico Maria Sardelli the chamber concerto version of La tempesta di mare, RV 98, was possibly written for Ignazio Sieber, during the time in which he worked with the composer at the Ospedale della Pietà from 1713 to 1716. This means that this version of the concerto may have been the earliest flute concerto ever composed, and also the first flute piece to include the problematic high F6. Sardelli's conclusions, if correct, would overturn "the received scholarly view that, rather than writing for the recorder in the first two or three decades of the eighteenth century, then switching over to the flute, Vivaldi already preferred the flute in the 1710s and did not start writing for the recorder until the early 1720s".

Structure 

The movements of the concerto are:
 Allegro
 Largo
 Presto

Reception 

RV 433 is not among the five concertos Vivaldi composed for the recorder (RV 441–445). Being one of the 14 concertos Vivaldi wrote for traverso (including one for two traversos), the concerto is nonetheless often performed as a recorder concerto, like many of these other traverso concertos. Thus it is for instance included in Dan Laurin's Recorder Concertos CD. There are dozens of recordings of the concerto, performed on the traverso as well as the recorder, for instance by Jean-Pierre Rampal in the 1960s, by Frans Brüggen and by Barthold Kuijken with La Petite Bande.

References

Sources
Score editions
 
 

Other

External links 
Recording by the San Francisco Early Music Ensemble, Voices of Music, with Hanneke van Proosdij on the recorder (official YouTube channel)

1728 compositions
Concertos by Antonio Vivaldi
Tempesta di mare, La
Compositions in F major